The 1978 NHRA Winternationals (commonly known as the Winternats) were a National Hot Rod Association (NHRA) drag racing event, held at  Auto Club Raceway  in Pomona, California, on 5 February; rain halted eliminations after round one was complete. Racing resumed on 13 February, only to have an unusual snow storm interrupt again; the final was held on 14 February.

Top Fuel Dragster 
The Top Fuel Dragster field was 16 cars.

Round one 
Top qualifier, and 1973 and 1975 winner, Don Garlits (in Swamp Rat XXIV, lost to #9 qualifier Richard Tharp. #3 qualifier Pat Dakin was defeated by #11 qualifier Rob Bruins. Shirley Muldowney qualified #6, and eliminated #14 qualifier Larry Sutton. #8 qualifier  Terry Capp lost to low qualifier Rick Ramsey. John Kimble, who qualified #12, was defeated by #4 qualifier John Abbott. Gary Beck qualified #7 and fell to Dick LaHaie, who qualified #15. !3 qualifier  Marvin Graham lost to #5 qualifier Gordon Fabeck. #2 qualifier Kelly Brown defeated #10 qualifier Jeb Allen.

Round two 
Abbott lost to Ramsey, Tharp to Fabeck, Muldowney to Brown, and Bruins to LaHaie.

Semi-final round 
Fabeck eliminated LaHaie and Brown defeated Ramsey.

Final round 
Brown defeated Fabeck, earning a US$12,000 prize.

Top Fuel Funny Car 
The Top Fuel Funny Car field was 16 cars; Billy Meyer and Jake Crimmins attended, but failed to qualify.

Round one 
Top qualifier Tripp Shumake, in the 1978 Plymouth Arrow, was defeated by Gary Burgin's 1978 Chevrolet Monza. Reigning 3-time winner Don "The Snake" Prudhomme's 1978 Arrow qualified #3 , and eliminated #11 qualifier Ed "The Ace" McCulloch's 1978 Arrow. "TV Tommy" Ivo qualified #2 in a 1978 Arrow, defeating Dave Hough's #10-qualifying 1978 Arrow. Ron Colson, qualified #12 in the 1978 Chevrolet Monza, was defeated by #4 qualifier Gordon Bonin's 1978 Pontiac Trans Am. #14 qualifier John Collins, in a 1977 Plymouth Duster, fell to the 1977 Chevrolet Camaro of Denny Savage. Dave Condit, who qualified #13 in a 1978 Arrow, lost to Tom "Mongoo$e" McEwen's #5-qualifying 1977 Chevrolet Corvette. Pat Foster qualified #7 in a 1978 Trans Am, and was eliminated by #15 qualifier Gene Snow's 1977 Arrow. Low qualifier Ezra Boggs (in the 1977 Chevrolet Corvette) lost to #8 qualifier, a 1978 Chevrolet Monza driven by Tom Prock (whose son Jimmy later became an NHRA mechanic and grandson Austin is a 2019 NHRA Top Fuel driver).

Round two 
Burgin, in the Monza, lost to McEwen. Bonin was defeated by Prock. Snow was eliminated by Prudhomme. Savge lost to Ivo.

Semi-final round 
McEwen faced Prudhomme, who advanced. Ivo defeated Prock.

Final round 
Prudhomme took a fourth straight Funny Car win at Pomona.

Top Alcohol Dragster

Top Alcohol Funny Car

Pro Stock 
The Pro Stock field was 16 cars.  Don Campanello qualified #7, but failed to make the start for round one; his place was taken by #17 qualifier Gary Hansen.

Round one 
Top qualifier Bob Glidden, in a 1978 Ford Pinto, eliminated #9 qualifier Lee Hunter's 1977 Ford Mustang. Jean Batteux qualified #13 in a 1977 Pinto, and was defeated by #5 qualifier Kevin Rotty's 1974 Camaro. #2 qualifier Warren Johnson's Camaro was eliminated by the AMC of #10 qualifier Wally Booth. #16 qualifier Brad Yuill's Monza lost to the Camaro of #8 qualifier Mark Yuill.  Larry Lombardo, qualified #12 in a 1978 Monza, defeated Sonny Bryant, who qualified #4 in a 1977 Camaro. #3 qualifier Frank Iaconio's Monza defeated the 1976 Duster of #11 qualifier Randy Humphrey. John Hagen qualified #14 in a 1978 Arrow, and was eliminated by Gordie Rivera's Monza. Low qualifier Hansen's 1975 Chevrolet Vega was eliminated by the #15-qualified 1977 Camaro of Tom Chelbana.

Round two 
Rotty lost to Glidden, Booth to Rivera, Yuill to Lombardo, and Chelbana to Iaconio.

Semi-final round 
Yuill was eliminated by Lombardo, Iaconio by Gildden.

Final round 
Glidden took the win over Iaconio.

Pro Stock Motorcycle

Super Stock

Notes 

1978 in sports in California
NHRA Winternationals
1978 in motorsport